George Joseph Thompson (27 October 1877 – 3 March 1943) was the mainstay of the Northamptonshire county cricket eleven for a long period encompassing both its days as a minor county and its earliest years in the County Championship.

A huge man, standing well over six feet tall and weighing more than 16 stone (102 kg), Thompson was an excellent all-rounder. Despite his huge frame, his batting relied chiefly on a very watchful eye that made him a very hard man to dismiss when pitches were hard and firm. Though at times he would hit very hard, he had very little backlift and could play only a restricted range of strokes, and his size made him rather slow of foot and hence seldom likely to make many runs on the numerous rain-affected pitches of his day. As a bowler, he was above medium pace and could gain a great deal of spin, which made him respected when pitches were hard and frequently unplayable after rain or on a crumbling pitch. His large hands and long reach made him an excellent fieldsman at slip: in 1914 he achieved the previously unequalled feat as an out-fielder of taking three catches off consecutive balls against Warwickshire (indeed, this feat was not to be emulated by any other out-fielder until Marcus Trescothick in 2018: four wicket-keepers have also achieved a hat-trick of catches, but none of these predated Thompson's achievement.)

George Thompson was educated at Wellingborough School (1890–93).  He first played for Northamptonshire when they were not first-class as a teenager. His ability was shown so quickly, however, that the Marylebone Cricket Club (MCC) played him occasionally as early as 1897 (when he was not twenty). In 1900, Thompson surprised the critics with an excellent innings of 125 for the Players when called in at the last minute, but in the following three years he was amazingly successful for Northamptonshire in the Minor Counties Championship: in 1904, he averaged 36 with the bat and less than 10 with the ball, showing he was too good for that level.

When Northamptonshire became first-class in 1905, Thompson, though his team-mates showed themselves unable to compete at a higher level than Minor Counties cricket, bowled superbly even if he was aided by playing mostly during the wettest weather of the summer. The reward was a deserved Cricketer of the Year selection. Though he was overworked in the absence of support bowlers, Thompson bowled excellently in the following two years and did the "double" of 1000 runs and 100 wickets in 1906 – though on the difficult wickets of 1907 he did not once reach 50, and in 1908 his bowling was very disappointing.

Thompson rebounded so well in 1909 that he had his best season on record, taking 163 wickets and playing for England at Edgbaston (where his bowling was not required because George Hirst and Colin Blythe were so deadly). In the following winter his watchful eye on the matting wickets allowed Thompson to play the South African "googly" bowlers with more assurance than anybody except Jack Hobbs and in 1910 he again did the "double". On the rock-hard wickets of 1911, Thompson bowled as well as ever – so well that he headed the first-class averages, whilst his bowling and slip catching was a major factor in Northamptonshire rising to one of the top counties in 1912 and 1913.

Whilst he showed some decline as a bowler in 1914, Thompson batted better than ever, and it was a great pity for Northamptonshire that serious injuries prevented him playing at all until 1921, when he had lost his bowling completely but retained some of his batting skill. After a few games in 1922, Thompson's career ended tamely.

References

External links

1877 births
1943 deaths
People educated at Wellingborough School
Auckland cricketers
England Test cricketers
English cricketers
Northamptonshire cricketers
Marylebone Cricket Club cricketers
Players cricketers
North v South cricketers
Wisden Cricketers of the Year
English Test cricket umpires
Lord Hawke's XI cricketers
Lord Londesborough's XI cricketers
Marylebone Cricket Club South African Touring Team cricketers